SS Tararua was a passenger steamer that struck the reef off Waipapa Point in the Catlins on 29 April 1881, and sank the next day, in the worst civilian shipping disaster in New Zealand's history. Of the 151 passengers and crew on board, only 20 survived the shipwreck.

Ship
Built in Dundee by Gourlay Brothers in 1864, her original capacity was 523 tons (net) but alterations later increased her net tonnage to 563 tons.

History

Grounding
On 20 December 1865. Tararua ran aground at Cape Farewell, New Zealand whilst on a voyage from Sydney, New South Wales to Nelson, New Zealand. She was refloated the next day and completed her voyage.

Wreck

Sailing from Port Chalmers, Dunedin at 5 pm on 29th April 1881, the Tararua was en route to Melbourne via Bluff and Hobart. Steering by land on a dark night, with clear skies overhead but a haze over the land, the captain turned the ship west at 4 am believing they had cleared the southernmost point. After breakers were heard at 4:25 am, they steered away to the W by S-half-S for 20 minutes before heading west again. At around 5 am, the ship struck the Otara Reef, which runs 13 km (8 mi) out from Waipapa Point.

Waves caused the S.S Tararua to list to port a little bit. George Lawnace got in a boat then jumped into the waves to swim ashore to warn a man who was named Charles Gilbee who rode his horse to Wyndham to send a message. At 11am a wave caused the bridge to fall. At  1 pm, it was not marked urgent. At 2pm the Tararua started to break as the stern slowy smashed into the rock's, and it took until 5 pm for the Hawea to leave port with supplies. Meanwhile, the wind and waves had risen. Around noon, six passengers who were strong swimmers were taken close to shore; three managed to get through the surf, with the help of the earlier volunteer, but the others drowned. On a return trip, one man attempted to get ashore on the reef, but had to give up; another three drowned trying to swim to the beach. Eight of its nine crew survived, and the locals who had gathered on the shore could not repair it. The remaining boat could no longer reach the ship, due to the waves, and stood out to sea in hope of flagging down a passing ship to help. The Tararua took over 20 hours to sink, with the stern going under around 10 pm a voice yelled out “a boat for God’s sake a boat”. The last cries of the victims were heard at 2:30 am when a loud crash was heard before a loud cry then stillness.

About 74 bodies were recovered, of which 55 were buried in a nearby plot that came to be known as the "Tararua Acre". Three gravestones and a memorial plinth remain there today.

Inquiry
A Court of Inquiry found that the disaster was primarily caused by the ship's captain failing to establish his correct position at 4am, before changing course to head west. An able-bodied seaman was also blamed for not keeping a proper lookout, from which breakers would have been heard in time to avoid the reef. The court recommended that steamers should carry enough lifebelts for all their passengers (there were only twelve on the Tararua) and that a lighthouse should be built at Waipapa Point. The lighthouse began operating in 1884.

Previous incident
The Tararua had a narrow escape on a previous voyage in 1865, suffering no damage after grounding on a beach at Cape Farewell.

See also
List of New Zealand disasters by death toll

References

Sources

External links
 A. Asbjorn Jon, 'Shipwrecks, Tourism and The Catlins Coast', Australian Folklore 2008
Wreck of the S.S. Tararua, 29 April 1881
The S.S. TARARUA Wrecked in Foveaux Strait 29 April 1881
Photos of the "Tararua Acre"

1864 ships
Ships built in Dundee
1881 in New Zealand
Maritime incidents in December 1865
Maritime incidents in April 1881
History of Southland, New Zealand
Ships of the Union Steam Ship Company
Steamships
Shipwrecks of New Zealand
The Catlins
Foveaux Strait
Southland District